Events from the year 1852 in Sweden

Incumbents
 Monarch – Oscar I

Events
 - Amalia Assur becomes the first female dentist in Sweden.
 - The manufacturer Hästens is established. 
 - Kungsportsplatsen is inaugurated. 
 - Sophia Posse takes over the Hammarstedtska skolan.

Births
 25 April - Fritz Eckert, architect  (died 1920) 
 14 December - Prince Carl Oscar, Duke of Södermanland, prince (died 1854) 
 13 June – Anna Whitlock, social reformer and women's rights activist (died 1930) 
 23 May - Mathilda Grabow, opera singer (soprano)  (died 1940)
 24 November - Helena Munktell, composer  (died 1919)

Deaths
 25 May - Charlotta Berger, writer (born 1784)
 18 June - Prince Gustaf, Duke of Uppland, composer  (born 1827)
 Aurora Wilhelmina Koskull, politically active salonnière  (born 1778)
 Gustav Åbergsson, actor  (born 1775)
 Ulrika Åberg, ballerina  (born 1771)
 Laura Bergnéhr, actress
 Mor Kerstin i Stämmemand-Kinna, Swedish industrialist (born 1774)
 3 April - Marie-Louise af Forsell, diarist (born 1812)

References

 
Years of the 19th century in Sweden